Keith Moffatt (born June 20, 1984) is an American high jumper.

He holds a personal best jump of 2.30 metres.

Career Highlights
2006 & 2009 USA Outdoor runner-up 
3rd at 2005 USA Outdoors 
2003 Junior Pan Am Games gold medalist 
2004 NCAA DII Champion
2003 USA Outdoor Junior Champion
2002 VHSL State Record 7'3"

References

External links
 
 

1984 births
Living people
American male high jumpers